Aaron Craig Shingler (born 7 August 1987) is a Wales international rugby union player and former cricketer. His usual rugby position is flanker.

Background
Born 7 August 1987, Shingler grew up in the west of Wales, attending Pontarddulais Comprehensive School and Gorseinon Tertiary College.

Cricket
Before turning to professional rugby, Shingler was a promising cricketer. He bats right-handed and is a right-arm medium-fast bowler. Having played for the previous three seasons in the Second XI, Shingler signed to the senior Glamorgan team for the 2007 season. However, he was released from the club at the end of the season. He played once for the England Under-19s team in a Youth One-Day International against Bangladesh in 2005 and has also played for Wales Minor Counties in the MCCA Trophy.

Rugby
After being released by Glamorgan, Shingler signed for Welsh Premier Division rugby union side Llanelli RFC. In April 2009, he was promoted to the Scarlets regional side for their West Wales derby match against the Ospreys on 18 April. He then played in three of the Scarlets' four remaining fixtures, missing only the 45–8 away defeat by Leinster as he was playing for Llanelli in the 2009 WRU Challenge Cup final against Neath. He scored a solo 70-metre try, but it was not enough to prevent Neath from winning 27–21.

Shingler missed much of the 2020–21 season, due to a career threatening blood infection called reactive arthritis. He returned to playing in March 2021.

International
In 2010, Shingler was selected for Wales' 2010 Commonwealth Games Sevens squad.

In January 2012, Shingler was called into Wales' 35-man senior squad for the training camp in Poland prior to the 2012 Six Nations Championship. He made his full international debut for Wales against Scotland on 12 February 2012.

International tries

References

External links
Profile at ECB.co.uk

1987 births
Living people
Commonwealth Games rugby sevens players of Wales
Cricketers from Aldershot
English people of Welsh descent
Welsh rugby union players
People educated at Pontarddulais Comprehensive School
Rugby sevens players at the 2010 Commonwealth Games
Rugby union flankers
Rugby union players from Aldershot
Scarlets players
Wales international rugby union players
Wales National County cricketers
Welsh cricketers